This is a list of feminist art critics. The list includes art critics that "reflect a woman's consciousness about women" and who have played a role in the feminist art movement. It includes second-wave and third-wave feminist critics.

B 
 Judith Barry
 Rosemary Betterton
 Lisa E. Bloom
 Frances Borzello
 Norma Broude

C 
 Whitney Chadwick

D 
 Pen Dalton
 Carol Duncan
 Katy Deepwell
 Debbie Duffin

E 
 Lee R. Edwards

F 
 Joanna Fateman
 Mathilde Ferrer
 Sandy Flitterman-Lewis
 Joanna Frueh

G 
 Shrifra Goldman
 Mary Garrard
 Alison M. Gingeras

H 
 Paula Harper
 Maryse Holder
 Elizabeth Hess

I 
 Kornelia Imesch

J 
 Carol Jacobsen
 Jennifer John

L 
 Cassandra L. Langer
 Teresa de Lauretis
 Estella Lauter
 Lucy R. Lippard

M 
 Elizabeth A. MacGregor
 Patricia Mathews "Go Gentle"
 Marsha Meskimmon
 Daniela Mondini

N 
 Cynthia Navaretta
Linda Nochlin "Why Are There No Great Women Artists?"

O 
 Gloria Feman Orenstein

P 
 Rozsika Parker
 Griselda Pollock

R 
 Arlene Raven
 Amy Richards
 Moira Roth

S 
 Kristine Stiles
 Lowery Stokes Sims

T 
 Gilane Tawadros

V 
 Lea Vergine
Lise Vogel

W 
 Val A. Walsh
 Josephine Withers
 Janet Wolff
 Ann-Sargent Wooster

References 

Art critics, List of feminist
feminist art critics, List of
feminist art critics, List of
feminist art critics, List of